Enyart may refer to 
Enyart, Missouri, an unincorporated community in the United States

People with the surname
Bill Enyart (1947–2015), American football player
Bob Enyart (1959–2021), American conservative talk radio host, author and pastor 
Terry Enyart (1950–2007), American baseball pitcher 
William Enyart (born 1949), American politician